Soulframe was an Australian rock band formed on the Gold Coast, Queensland in 1998. The members of the band are Guy "Mutto" Mutton, Hayden Whitworth, Scott Smith and Zane Carey. The band formed in 1998 and were joined by vocalist Guy "Mutto" Mutton in 2000. They released two albums, 
Sojourn and Escaping Entropy. Soulframe have won multiple awards, and headlined major Australian music festivals such as AGMF, Sonfest and Black Stump. In 2006, their lead vocalist "Mutto" won a place in the final 12 on Australian Idol. He was the fourth contestant eliminated in the finals.

Soulframe supported Australian and International acts such as Grinspoon, Motor Ace, Evermore and Delirious?.

Following "Mutto"'s time on Australian Idol, he decided to stand down from the band in July 2007 for personal reasons, and the band subsequently went on a break after six months. On 1 February 2008, the band posted a message on their website, formally announcing the end to Soulframe.

Discography

Albums
2001 – Sojourn (Toupee Records)
Produced and recorded by Scott Mullane @ Aisle 6 Recording (formerly Harmony Recording)
2005 – Escaping Entropy (distributed nationally by MGM
Recorded at Studios 301 in Byron Bay

References

External links
 Soulframe on Myspace
 Soulframe on Pure Volume
 Guymutton.com
 Mutto's Australian Idol profile

Australian indie rock groups
Queensland musical groups
Musical groups established in 1998
Musical groups disestablished in 2008